Government Postgraduate College Sahiwal is a college in Sahiwal, Punjab, Pakistan. It is situated next to Canal Colony, beside Farid Town, an upscale, planned residential area of Sahiwal.

The Sahiwal Government College's History It starts back in 1942, when some educators established Government College Montgomery in a rented building on a circular road in the city.

College faculties include Physics, Computer Science, Zoology, Botany, Chemistry, Mathematics, English, Urdu, Islamic Studies, Pakistan Studies, History, Persian and Philosophy. Students from all over the district and from neighbouring districts come to study at the college.

Buildings include the main college building (divided into the intermediate and bachelors sections), two library buildings (Malik Anwar Library and Majeed Amjad Library), a cafeteria, a recreational building with a swimming pool, two mosques, three hostel buildings (Jinnah Hall, Iqbal Hall, and Fatima Hall), a building for the Directorate of Education Colleges, Sahiwal Division, Sahiwal, and a building for the Board of Intermediate and Secondary Education (BISE) Sahiwal.

Departments and faculty
Government Postgraduate College sahiwal has 20 departments
Department of Botany & Biology 
Department of Chemistry
Department of Computer Science
Department of Education
Department of English
Department of Economics
Department of Geography
Department of Health & Physical Education
Department of History
Department of Islamiat
Department of Mass Communication
Department of Mathematics
Department of Philosophy
Department of Persian
Department of Physics
Department of Political Science
Department of Punjabi
Department of Sociology
Department of Statistics
Department of Urdu

Programs
Govt. PostGraduate College Sahiwal is offering following list of programs;

 M.Sc (Physics, Chemistry, Botany, Mathematics and Statistics) (2 years)
 MA (English, Urdu and Economics) (2 years)
 BS (Honors) degree Programs (4 years)
 F.Sc (Pre-Engineering, Pre-Medical)
 FA  (Arts, General Science)
 ICS (Computer Science)
 Short Courses

References

External links
Official website

Universities and colleges in Sahiwal District